The Virginia Slims of New England is a defunct WTA Tour affiliated women's tennis tournament played from 1986 to 1990. It was held in Worcester, Massachusetts in the United States and played on indoor carpet courts.

Martina Navratilova was the most successful player at the tournament, winning the singles and doubles competitions four times each, partnering American Pam Shriver for her doubles successes.

Results

Singles

Doubles

References
 WTA Results Archive

External links

 
Carpet court tennis tournaments
Indoor tennis tournaments
1986 establishments in Massachusetts
Defunct tennis tournaments in the United States
Virginia Slims tennis tournaments
Tennis tournaments in Massachusetts